is a 2015 greatest hits album by the Japanese band Dreams Come True. It was released on July 7, 2015. It was number-one on the Oricon Weekly Albums Chart for six non-consecutive weeks. It was the third best-selling album of 2015 in Japan according to the Oricon Yearly Albums Chart, with 828,505 copies sold.

Charts

Year-end charts

References

2015 greatest hits albums
Dreams Come True (band) albums